Frances Issette Jessie Pearson, known as Issette, (2 November 1861 – 25 April 1941) was an English golfer and the first honorary secretary of the Ladies Golf Union which was founded in 1893.

Personal life
Pearson was born at Gatcombe House, Littlehempston, near Totnes, Devon. Her given names were Mable Frances, but she used the names Frances Issette Jessie and was known as Issette. She married Thomas Horrocks Miller (1846–1916) in 1911.

Golf career

In 1893 Pearson visited Littlestone golf club in the autumn of 1893 to see if the national championship could be hosted there. She was hosted by Littlestone's ladies's captain Mabel Stringer. Stringer beat her on their first game together, but they became life long friends and colleagues.

Pearson had reached the final of the British Ladies Amateur Golf Championship in 1893 and she would repeat that position in 1894, losing to Lady Margaret Scott on each occasion.

Legacy
While telegraphic addresses were in use the LGU's address was "Issette". A brand of ladies' golfwear is named "Issette" in her memory. She founded a cup and a handicap system that allowed men and women of mixed abilities to compete together.

Publications
The Ladies' Golf Union year book / compiled and edited by the Hon. Sec. Ladies' Golf Union (I. Pearson). (London : Ladies' Golf Union, 189?)
Our Lady of the Green. A book of ladies' golf. With chapters by I. Pearson, A. B. Pascoe and others. Edited by L. Mackern and M. Boys. (London : Lawrence & Bullen, 1899)

References

English female golfers
Golf administrators
People from South Hams (district)
People from Singleton, Lancashire
1861 births
1941 deaths